Kim Tae-young may refer to:

 Kim Tae-young (general)
 Kim Tae-young (footballer born 1970), retired South Korean football player
 Kim Tae-young (footballer born 1982), South Korean professional footballer for Yangju FC
 Kim Tae-young (footballer born 1987), South Korean footballer for Bucheon FC 1995